William E. Carter (November 17, 1833 – August 15, 1905) was a member of the Wisconsin State Assembly.

Biography
Carter was born William Edward Carter in Piecombe, Sussex, England on November 17, 1833. He moved to Lancaster, Wisconsin in 1850 with his parents and to Platteville, Wisconsin in 1861. He was admitted to the Wisconsin bar and practiced law in Platteville, Wisconsin. In 1895, he moved to Milwaukee, Wisconsin where he practiced law. Carter died on August 15, 1905, in Milwaukee, Wisconsin, and was buried in Lancaster.

Career
Carter was a member of the Assembly from 1877 to 1879. He was a Republican.

References

English emigrants to the United States
Politicians from Milwaukee
People from Platteville, Wisconsin
People from Lancaster, Wisconsin
Wisconsin lawyers
Republican Party members of the Wisconsin State Assembly
1833 births
1905 deaths
Lawyers from Milwaukee
19th-century American politicians